Capen Street station is a light rail station in Milton, Massachusetts. It serves the MBTA Ashmont–Mattapan High Speed Line. It is located on Capen Street off Eliot Street; the westernmost of the four MBTA stations in Milton, it consists of two side platforms flanking the eponymous street's grade crossing. The platforms are staggered to allow trains to make the stop at Capen Street before crossing the street itself, as there is no signal at the grade crossing. Capen Street is accessible via wooden ramps on both platforms. Capen Street opened in September 1930 as an infill station on the line.

History

Residents on Capen Street, having to use the Valley Road stop despite the line crossing Capen Street, requested a station of their own; it was considered a likely possibility at the time of the line's opening. After considering the walking distance from Capen Street to Valley Road and Mattapan, the BERy granted the request. The Boston Transit Department constructed  by  gravel platforms with overhead lighting. The completed station opened as a flag stop in September 1930. A second infill stop at Butler Street opened the next year.

On October 8, 1982, a shotgun-wielding man attempted to rob the six passengers aboard an inbound trolley at Capen Street. One of the passengers foiled the attempt by grabbing the unloaded gun from the robber.

The MBTA closed the line on June 24, 2006 to allow a new viaduct to be constructed at Ashmont station. During the closure, all stations on the line were modernized and (except for ) made accessible. The old shelter and platforms were replaced by modern platforms with canopies, with a wooden ramp on each platform for accessibility. Streetcar service resumed on December 22, 2007.

References

External links

 MBTA — Capen Street
 Image of Capen Street in 1970

Red Line (MBTA) stations
Railway stations in Norfolk County, Massachusetts
Railway stations in the United States opened in 1930
Milton, Massachusetts